Joseph Baggaley ( – 19 October 1918) was a trade unionist, born in England, who came to Regina, Saskatchewan, Canada with his wife and four children in 1911.

Baggaley was a bricklayer by trade who had come to the prairies probably as a result of attractive advertisements back in England. He was a strong trade unionist and upon his arrival in Canada he joined the Local 1 of the Bricklayers, Masons, and Plasterers' International Union of America (now the International Union of Bricklayers and Allied Craftworkers.)

In 1915 he was elected president of his union, and was re-elected in 1918. He fought many important labour battles during his short tenure including outlining their position on the initiative for military registration and conscription in 1916–17.

Baggaley died of pneumonia in 1918.

References

External links
Biography at the Dictionary of Canadian Biography Online

1880s births
1918 deaths
People from Regina, Saskatchewan
Canadian trade unionists
Deaths from pneumonia in Saskatchewan
Bricklayers
English emigrants to Canada